The Five may refer to:

Film
 The Five (film), a 2013 South Korean film
 El 5 de Talleres, a 2015 film set in Argentina
 Top Five, a 2014 American film starring Chris Rock

Literature
 The Five (gods), a group of five gods in Trudi Canavan's Age of the Five trilogy
 The Five: The Untold Lives of the Women Killed by Jack the Ripper, a 2019 non-fiction book
 The Famous Five (novel series), a children's novel series by Enid Blyton

Music 
 The5, an Arab boy band with members from Algeria, Morocco, Egypt and Lebanon
 The Five (composers), a group of Russian nationalist composers
 Five (group) (stylised as 5ive), British boy band from London

TV 
 The Five (talk show), a news and opinion program featuring Fox News commentators
 The Five (TV series), a 2016 British crime drama television series on Sky1
 "The Five" (Sanctuary), an episode of the science fiction series Sanctuary
 "The Five" (The Vampire Diaries) an episode of the TV series The Vampire Diaries

Other uses
 The New York Five, a group of five New York City architects, 1969–1975
 Interstate 5 in California, commonly referred to as "the 5" by people from Southern California
 De Fem, a group founded by Anna Cassel and Hilma af Klint, 1896–1907

See also
 5 (disambiguation)
 The Central Park Five (disambiguation)